Cozahome is an unincorporated community in Searcy County, Arkansas, United States.

References

Unincorporated communities in Searcy County, Arkansas
Unincorporated communities in Arkansas
Arkansas placenames of Native American origin